"Fever" is a song by American rock band The Black Keys. It was released on March 24, 2014, as the lead single from their eighth studio album, Turn Blue. On April 15, 2014, the song was released on CD with the album's title track as a B-side, along with a credit applicable to purchases of the physical formats of the album. For the 57th Annual Grammy Awards, "Fever" was nominated for Best Rock Song and Best Rock Performance.

Recording
"Fever" was recorded in January 2013 at Key Club in Benton Harbor, Michigan, during the group's initial recording sessions for Turn Blue. Describing the song's origin, guitarist Dan Auerbach said, "that one started with that melody. And it was [drummer Patrick Carney] and I on our own; we recorded that song and it came pretty quickly. I had that melody in my mind, worked out what the chords were and then we kept it really simple. We kept the bass and drums simple and dancey and tried to keep it upbeat — sort of like Motown". The group worked on the song's coda with producer Danger Mouse in subsequent sessions.

Music video
The music video was directed by Theo Wenner, son of Rolling Stone co-founder Jann Wenner, and was released on May 1, 2014. It features  Auerbach portraying a sweaty televangelist preaching to an audience as Carney sits nearby. During the video, a phone number flashes on screen accompanied by a scrolling list of people who have donated.

The video was nominated for a 2014 MTV Video Music Award for Best Rock Video.

Track listing

Personnel
Dan Auerbach: vocals, guitars, bass
Patrick Carney: drums
Brian Burton: synthesizers

Charts

Weekly charts

Year-end charts

Release history

References

External links
 Full lyrics of this song at DirectLyrics

The Black Keys songs
Songs written by Dan Auerbach
Songs written by Patrick Carney
2014 singles
2014 songs
Songs written by Danger Mouse (musician)
Song recordings produced by Danger Mouse (musician)